Solita Solano (30 October 1888 – 22 November 1975), born Sarah Wilkinson, was an American writer, poet and journalist.

Biography

Early life 
Sarah Wilkinson came from a middle-class family and attended the Emma Willard School in Troy, New York. After the death of her father, she left home and married her childhood sweetheart Oliver Filley. They spent the next four years in the Philippines, in China and in Japan, where her husband worked as an engineer. They returned to New York in 1908, where she started work as a theatre critic and drama editor with the New-York Tribune and as a freelance contributor to the National Geographic Society. At this time she changed her name to Solita Solano.

Career and relationships

In 1919, Solano got to know the journalist Janet Flanner in  Greenwich Village with whom she started a relationship. In 1921 they travelled to Greece, where Janet was to work on a report for National Geographic on Constantinople. Solano had three books published, and as they were not very successful, returned to journalism. In 1922, they travelled to  France, and in Paris they joined the intellectual-lesbian circle of Gertrude Stein and Alice B. Toklas, Natalie Clifford Barney, Romaine Brooks and Djuna Barnes.

In 1929, Solano had an affair with Margaret Anderson, founder of The Little Review, who had come to Paris with her lover, French singer Georgette Leblanc. The affair lasted several years, though Anderson remained living with Leblanc.

While in Paris, Janet Flanner started writing, under the Pseudonym Genêt, the Letter from Paris, for The New Yorker.  After the outbreak of World War II Solano and Flanner returned to New York.

A few years later Solano left Flanner after Flanner started an affair with Natalia Danesi Murray; meanwhile Solano fell in love with Elizabeth Jenks Clark. Margaret Anderson got to know Clark through Solano after Clark returned to the US. Clark and Solano became Anderson's closest friends, although Anderson had in the meantime fallen in love with Dorothy Caruso, widow of the singer Enrico Caruso.

As Gurdjieff's follower 
During the 1930s and 40s, Solano studied with G. I. Gurdjieff, and for a while acted as his secretary. She was a member of a key Gurdjieff group known as "The Rope," to which Jane Heap, Margaret Anderson, and Kathryn Hulme also belonged. After Gurdjieff's death in 1949, Solano became the focal point for members of The Rope until her own death. Her notes of Gurdjieff's meetings with The Rope are a remarkable record of his personality and method.

Later life and death

After the war Solano returned to France, where she died at the age of 87.

References

Sources
 Berenice Abbott: Portrait of Solita Solano, Parasol Press, Ltd. (1981)
 William Patrick Patterson: Ladies of the Rope: Gurdjieff's Special Left Bank Women's Group, Arete Pubns (1998) 
 Andrea Weiss: Paris war eine Frau, Rowohlt (1998) 
 Gabriele Griffin: Who's Who in Lesbian and Gay and Writing, Routledge, London (2002)

External links
 
 
 
1915 passport photo(courtesy flickr.com)

1888 births
1975 deaths
American women poets
Emma Willard School alumni
American LGBT poets
American LGBT journalists
LGBT people from New York (state)
Writers from Troy, New York
Journalists from New York (state)
American expatriates in France
20th-century American poets
American women journalists
20th-century American women writers
Death in France
20th-century American non-fiction writers
Students of George Gurdjieff